Geert Schipper is a Dutch paralympic paratriathlete. He participated at the 2016 Summer Paralympics in the paratriathlon competition, being awarded the silver medal in the men's PT1 event. Schipper also participated at the 2020 Summer Paralympics in the paratriathlon competition.

References

External links 
Paralympic Games profile

Living people
Place of birth missing (living people)
Year of birth missing (living people)
Dutch male triathletes
Paratriathletes at the 2016 Summer Paralympics
Medalists at the 2016 Summer Paralympics
Paratriathletes at the 2020 Summer Paralympics
Paralympic medalists in paratriathlon
Paratriathletes of the Netherlands
Paralympic silver medalists for the Netherlands
21st-century Dutch people